Ruy Alberto Duarte Gomes de Carvalho (22 April 1941 – 12 August 2010) was an Angolan author and filmmaker, whose work, which over more than three decades spanned poetry, metafiction, and anthropology, focused on the Kuvale people of the southern Angola. Writing for Carvalho's entry in the Dictionary of African Biography (2012), Livia Apa commented that even if "In their complexity, Ruy Duarte de Carvalho's works are some of the most interesting and original works in contemporary Portuguese literature. Curiously, in spite of its importance, his work is rarely translated or taught abroad. Only a few of his books have been recently published in Brazil, and most of his films have disappeared, or been lost or badly damaged." Since 2016, some of the films he directed between 1975 and 1989 can be watched online at RDC Virtual.

Carvalho is highly influenced by the work of fellow Angolan writer José Luandino Vieira and by the Brazilian writer João Guimarães Rosa. Rosa's influence on Carvalho's work can be seem in the novel Desmedida (2006), whose narrative often overlaps with some of the Brazilian author's canon, including intertextual references to Rosa's novel Grande sertão: veredas (The Devil to Pay in the Backlands). The book Desmedida (Unmeasured) is deliberately divided between two-halves, but there's a "third half", the metafiction novel A terceira metade (2009), which is announced at the end of Desmedida and is a play on Rosa's short story A terceira margem do rio (The Third Bank of the River).

Bibliography 
 Chão de oferta (1972), poetry
 A decisão da idade (1976), poetry
 Como se o mundo não tivesse leste: estórias do sul e seca (1977), short stories
 Exercícios de crueldade (1978), poetry
 Sinais misteriosos... já se vê... (1979), poetry
 O camarada e a câmara: cinema e antropologia para além do filme etnográfico (1980), essay
 Ondula, savana branca (1982), poetry
 Lavra paralela (1987), poetry
 Hábito da terra (1988), poetry
 Ana a Manda: os filhos da rede (1989), essay
 Memória de tanta guerra (1992), poetry
 Ordem de esquecimento (1997), poetry
 Aviso à navegação (1997), essay
 A câmara, a escrita e a coisa dita...: fitas, textos e paletras (1997), essay
 Vou lá visitar pastores (1999), essay
 Lavra reiterada (2000), poetry
 Observação directa (2000), poetry
 Os papéis do inglês (2000), metafiction
 Os Kuvale na história, nas guerras e nas crises: artigos e comunicações 1994–2001 (2002), essay
 Actas da maianga (2003), essay
 Lavra: poesia reunida 1970–2000, poetry
 As paisagens propícias (2005), metafiction
 Desmedida: Luanda, São Paulo, São Francisco e volta (2006), travel literature
 A terceira metade (2009), metafiction

References 

1941 births
2010 deaths
20th-century anthropologists
Angolan film directors
Angolan male poets
Angolan writers
Anthropology educators
Ethnologists
Portuguese-language writers
Portuguese expatriates in Angola
Social anthropologists
Visual anthropologists
People from Santarém, Portugal
People from Swakopmund
Naturalized citizens of Angola